The Bishop of Mayo was an episcopal title which took its name after Mayo in Ireland. After the Reformation, the title was briefly used by the Church of Ireland until 1559 and by the Roman Catholic Church until 1631. With each denomination, the bishopric was united to the archbishopric of Tuam.

History
The diocese of Mayo was not established at the Synod of Rathbreasail in 1111, but was recognised at the Synod of Kells in 1152. A bishop of Mayo, probably Gille Ísa Ua Maílín, took the oath of fealty to King Henry II of England in 1172. The bishopric in some way represented the lordship of Connacht taniste Muirchertach Muimhnech Ua Conchobair and his family Clan Murtagh O'Conor who controlled the area up to the 1230s.

In 1202, the papal legate, Cardinal John, had the see of Mayo united to the archbishopric of Tuam. In 1216, Pope Innocent III heard the case in Rome, and gave sentence in favour of Tuam. His sentence was maintained by papal legate James in 1221, and was finally confirmed by Pope Gregory IX on 3 July 1240. However, in the first half of the fifteenth century, Mayo appears to have gained independence with further bishops of Mayo being appointed, although their position is unclear and may have been assistant or suffragan bishops.

Following the Reformation, there were parallel successions in the Church of Ireland and the Roman Catholic Church. Circa 1559, the see was united to the archbishopric of Tuam in the Church of Ireland. The Roman Catholic see continued until the early seventeenth century, when, after a long vacancy, it was united to the archdiocese of Tuam in 1631.

List of bishops

Pre-Reformation bishops

Bishops during the Reformation

Post-Reformation bishops

References

Mayo
Mayo
Religion in County Mayo
Mayo
Former Roman Catholic bishoprics in Ireland
Bishops of Mayo